The Battle of Junín was a military engagement of the Peruvian War of Independence, fought in the highlands of the Junín Region on 6 August 1824. The preceding February the royalists had regained control of Lima, and having regrouped in Trujillo, Simón Bolívar in June led his rebel forces south to confront the Spanish under Field Marshal José de Canterac.

Battle
Bolivar sent some 8,000 soldiers, in a hurry to try to cut the royalist retreat towards Cusco, also with a force 8,000 soldiers. Bolivar also sent out his 1,000-strong cavalry to delay the movement of Spanish troops out of the Plain of Junin. The Spanish sent out their cavalry of some 1,300 riders to disrupt the incoming patriot cavalry to give Canterac time to withdraw his infantry from the plain. The plain is a marshland close to Junin Lake at around 4,100 meters over sea level.

The patriot troops were trying to arrange for battle when they were struck by the charge of the Spanish cavalry and sent back in confusion. The Spanish charge first hit the squadron of Colombian Grenadiers under General Necochea and including Mayor Otto Felipe Braun as one of its commanders, which managed to contain the charge the Spanish cavalry, stopping at moments such attack.  General Miller, in command of 250 Hussars of Peru, was tasked with outflanking the right of Canterac's cavalry, but was unable to execute the orders by the surprising Spanish attack and had to charge frontally, being thrown into the melee with the Andes Grenadiers and the Hussar of Colombia. General Necochea was wounded and made prisoner, only part of the Grenadiers of Colombia, under the command of Mayor Braun, managed to breach the enemy's lines, being in an advantageous position while the bulk of the patriot's cavalry was in disorderly retreat. Witnessing such critical moment, General Bolivar, who was overlooking the imminent defeat from a hill, retreated to the rearguard to accelerate the march of the infantry.

At that moment, all Spanish squads in pursue of the enemy taken for defeated, lost the initial compact formation and didn't notice that the First Squad of Hussars of Peru, under the command of Lieutenant Colonel Isidoro Suarez, had not yet entered the battle, hidden behind a hill in the battlefield. Colonel Suarez and his squad were waiting for orders while observing the exposed left flank of the Spanish, when he received a communication from Mayor Jose Andres Razuri, letting know of a false order purportedly given by General La Mar, to charge the Spanish cavalry in pursue of the patriot's cavalry. Lieutenant Colonel Suarez ordered the charge and the Spanish were taken completely by surprise, being horribly butchered. Seeing the new twist in the melee, the bulk of the patriot cavalry, under the command of General Miller replacing captured General Necochea, returned to the battle. The action of Coronel Silva managed to reorganize the Hussars of Colombia, avoiding being completely surrounded by the Spanish.

Attacked in the exposed flank and in the rear, the Spanish lost morale and retreated in a disorderly way. This development in the battle, unbeknownst to General Canterac, didn't let him understand the sudden and unexpected change, not finding a reasoning for such disband, as he informed later to the  Viceroy of Peru, José de la Serna e Hinojosa,. Thrown to the open land, the Spanish were completely defeated. The patriotic infantry regiments, which Bolivar had just ordered to march into the battlefield from the rearguard, arrived when the fight had ended.

Solely a cavalry battle, it lasted about 45 minutes and involved hand-to-hand cavalry clashes with lance and saber, with no firearms  used. About 250 royalist and 150 pro-independence fighters were killed.

The battle of Junin was one of the greatest episodes of the Peruvian War of Independence, compared by many historians to other battles such as Copiapo or Boyaca. The victory, which meant the destruction of the dominant Spanish Cavalry, which lost over 400 horses taken by the patriots, greatly enhanced the morale of the victorious pro-independence fighters, with a first win in Peru. The retreat of Canterac's troops after the defeat in Junin was relentless and defections from the Spanish royalist troops to the patriots increased considerably. Eventually the Viceroy de la Serna, had to step in as commander of the Spanish forces to try to restore morale.

The patriot victory paved the way for a final triumph over the Spanish, after the Peruvian Independence was proclaimed 3 years before, on 28 July 1821. The final Spanish capitulation would come after the Battle of Ayacucho, on 9 December 1824, when the then commander of Spanish forces, Viceroy de la Serna, finally surrendered to the patriot forces, ending the Spanish domination over South America.

Mayor Jose Andres Razuri was later reprimanded by General Jose de la Mar for inventing an order given by Bolivar, saying, "You should be executed, but today's victory is owed to you". The actions of Razuri and the First Squad of Hussar of Peru are widely considered as the most determinant in the outcome of the Battle of Junín. Bolivar highly praised the regiment of Hussars of Peru for their action in reverting the fate of the battle, renaming them Hussars of Junin, as they are known thereafter.

Post-battle debriefing note by General Santa Cruz, Chief of Staff, mentioning the outstanding officers

The Battle of Junin in literature
Ecuadorian poet José Joaquín de Olmedo, from Guayaquil, wrote a famous poem about the battle.
Argentinean writer Jorge Luis Borges wrote a poem about his famous ancestor, Manuel isidoro Suarez, who led the First Squad of Hussars of Peru at Junin.

Order of battle

References

Further reading
Higgins, James (editor). The Emancipation of Peru: British Eyewitness Accounts, 2014. Online at https://sites.google.com/site/jhemanperu

See also
 Battle of Ayacucho

Junin
Junin
Conflicts in 1824
Junin
History of Junín Region